is a passenger railway station located in the city of Hachiōji, Tokyo, Japan, operated by the private railway operator Keio Corporation. It is the main point of railway access to Mount Takao.

Lines 
The station is numbered "KO53".

Station layout

The station has a single dead-headed island platform serving two tracks located on the second floor ("2F") level, with the station entrance and concourse located on the ground floor.

Platforms

History

The station opened on October 1, 1967.

The station building was rebuilt in 2015 using wood from local cedar trees in a redesign overseen by architect Kengo Kuma, with work completed in April 2015. The station roof is modelled after the Yakuo-in Temple complex on Mount Takao.

Passenger statistics
In fiscal 2019, the station was used by an average of 10,431 passengers daily. 

The passenger figures (boarding passengers only) for previous years are as shown below.

Surrounding area
 Mount Takao
 National Route 20
 Kiyotaki Station on the Takaotozan Railway

See also
 List of railway stations in Japan

References

External links

Keio Corporation station information 
Keio Takaosan Onsen Gokurakuyu

Railway stations in Japan opened in 1967
Stations of Keio Corporation
Railway stations in Tokyo
Hachiōji, Tokyo
Keio Takao Line